Julius Vytautas Briedis (27 August 1940 – 22 September 2019) was a Lithuanian rower who specialized in the eight. In this boat class he won three silver medals at the European and world championships of 1962–1964 and finished fifth and third at the 1964 and 1968 Summer Olympics, respectively.

Briedis started rowing in 1955. Between 1959 and 1962 he worked as electrician and welder. In 1968 he graduated from the Vilnius branch of the Kaunas Polytechnic Institute and between 1969 and 1976 worked as an engineer. After that he coached rowing, first at Dynamo Vilnius and then at the national level. Since 1990 he acted as a sports functionary.

Briedis died on 22 September 2019 in Vilnius.

References

External links
 
 

1940 births
2019 deaths
Lithuanian male rowers
Medalists at the 1968 Summer Olympics
Olympic bronze medalists for the Soviet Union
Olympic medalists in rowing
Olympic rowers of the Soviet Union
People from Biržai District Municipality
Rowers at the 1964 Summer Olympics
Rowers at the 1968 Summer Olympics
Soviet male rowers
World Rowing Championships medalists for the Soviet Union
European Rowing Championships medalists